Paolo Barelli is an Italian Senator and suspended president of the Italian Swimming Federation, and a former  swimmer. On 24 July 2009 he was named Honorary Secretary of FINA for the 2009-2013 term. In October 2012 Barelli was elected president of LEN.

Biography
Paolo Barelli was born in Rome is a former athlete of the Gruppo Sportivo Fiamme Oro.

Barelli broke 23 times the Italian record in several distances, including the 100m butterfly and relays.

He swam for Italy at the 1972 and 1976 Summer Olympics.

In 1975 he won the 100m butterfly at the 1975 Mediterranean Games (58.10).

In the 1976 Olympics in Montreal, he reached the Olympic final with the 4 × 200 m Freestyle Relay (7th) and the 4 × 100 m Medley Relay (8th).

He was elected president of the Italian Swimming Federation in 2000; he is the first high-level swimmer to cover this position.

Barelli entered politics with the Silvio Berlusconi's party Forza Italia, was elected to the Italian Senate in 2001 and reelected in 2006.

References

1954 births
Living people
Politicians from Rome
Italian male swimmers
The People of Freedom politicians
21st-century Italian politicians
Forza Italia politicians
Olympic swimmers of Italy
Swimmers at the 1972 Summer Olympics
Swimmers at the 1976 Summer Olympics
Italian male freestyle swimmers
World Aquatics Championships medalists in swimming
Members of the Senate of the Republic (Italy)
Italian sportsperson-politicians
Mediterranean Games gold medalists for Italy
Swimmers at the 1975 Mediterranean Games
Mediterranean Games medalists in swimming
Swimmers of Fiamme Oro